John Haines   was an Anglican priest in the  17th century.

Haines and educated at Trinity College, Dublin.  He was Archdeacon of Dublin from 1625 until  1635.

Notes 

17th-century Irish Anglican priests
Alumni of Trinity College Dublin
Archdeacons of Dublin